Frank Mycroft (30 June 1873 – 26 September 1900) was an English cricketer who played for Derbyshire County Cricket Club between 1894 and 1895.

Mycroft started playing for Derbyshire in the 1893 season before they were included in the County Championship. Mycroft was a left-handed batsman who was last man in his matches.

Mycroft died in 1900 in Leicester, at the age of 27.

1873 births
1900 deaths
Derbyshire cricketers
People from Shirland
Cricketers from Derbyshire
Wicket-keepers